Cat In A Flat is an online cat-sitting brand that connects cat owners with local cat sitters.

History
Cat In A Flat was founded in 2014 by Julie Barnes and Kathrin Burckhardt after discovering the need of finding a cat sitter. In 2015-16, the company received investment through Crowdcube and expanded its operation in UK, Germany, Ireland, France, Belgium, Netherland, Austria, and Switzerland. In 2016, Cat In A Flat won the BIMA Award.

References

Brands
Cats as pets